Volker Strycek (born 13 October 1957 in Essen) is a German racecar driver and automobile manager.

In 1984 he became the first Deutsche Tourenwagen Meisterschaft champion, driving a BMW 635 CSi, without winning a race. He did not win a DTM race either when driving for Opel from 1989 to 1996.

After the original DTM faltered, he became a manager for Opel, leading the Opel Performance Center (OPC). He entered a DTM-Calibra on the Nürburgring Nordschleife in 1999, and in 2002 raced new DTM-Opel Astra there. Setting fast lap times, he proved that these advanced cars are suitable for the long and bumpy Nordschleife. As a result, several factory teams entered the 24 Hours Nürburgring in 2003, and Strycek won together with three of his employees. In 2004, they set the fastest lap. Strycek keeps on racing at the Nürburgring Nordschleife with various cars of Opel resp. General Motors, e.g. a Corvette.

Strycek, who is married and has two children, is since 2006 Professor at Technische Universität Berlin and since 2007 Automobilclub von Deutschland Sportpräsident.

Racing record

Complete Deutsche Tourenwagen Meisterschaft results
(key) (Races in bold indicate pole position) (Races in italics indicate fastest lap)

Complete International Touring Car Championship results
(key) (Races in bold indicate pole position) (Races in italics indicate fastest lap)

References

1957 births
Deutsche Tourenwagen Masters champions
Deutsche Tourenwagen Masters drivers
German racing drivers
Living people
Opel people
Sportspeople from Essen
Racing drivers from North Rhine-Westphalia
World Sportscar Championship drivers
24 Hours of Spa drivers
Team Joest drivers
Nürburgring 24 Hours drivers